An election to Clare County Council took place on 10 June 1999 as part of that year's Irish local elections. 32 councillors were elected from six local electoral areas by proportional representation by means of the single transferable vote (PR-STV) for a five-year term of office.

Results by party

Results by Electoral Area

Ennis

Ennistymon

Killaloe

Kilrush

Scariff

Shannon

External links
 Official website

1999 Irish local elections
1999